The 1971 NCAA Division I Men's Lacrosse Championship was the first Division I NCAA men's lacrosse tournament. Prior to this the United States Intercollegiate Lacrosse Association (USILA) had voted for the national champion and, subsequently, awarded the Wingate Memorial Trophy for the College lacrosse title based on regular season records.

Eight NCAA Division I college men's lacrosse teams met after having played their way through a regular season. The tournament culminated with the finals, held at Hofstra University in front of 5,458 fans. For this tournament as well as the 1972 tournament, the Wingate Memorial Trophy was presented to the winner.

College lacrosse at that time was broken into four divisions, so the NCAA tournament games for that year were based on geographical fit rather than seeding. The Tournament teams were selected from 114 schools which sponsored lacrosse at that time. Each division sent one team, two other teams were picked from the northern, southern and western divisions, and then two teams were chosen at large, chosen by a selection committee of five coaches and athletic directors.

Tournament overview

The Cornell Big Red, who posted a 13–1 record during the season, were led by coach Richard M. Moran and star players Bob Rule, John Burnap, Bob Shaw, and Alan Rimmer, defeated the 9-3 Maryland Terrapins 12 to 6 in the finals. Cornell had won 13 straight games leading up to the title game, losing only their opener by one goal to Virginia. Cornell won despite their first team All American goaltender Bob Rule being out with an injury. Backup goaltender Bob Buhmann, who also was the backup ice hockey goaltender to Ken Dryden, started in place of Rule and was credited with 25 saves as the Big Red shut down the Maryland attack. Buhmann also ended up as an honorable mention All American that season.

Canadian-born Al Rimmer, the first Canadian born NCAA lacrosse recruit, scored six goals in the finals to lead Cornell. Rimmer, from Toronto, had led Cornell with 43 goals and 31 assists for 74 points for the season. He ended his career as the all-time Cornell record-holder in career points with 80 goals and 82 assists for 162 points.

In 1970 in just his second year, Coach Moran’s team was the only squad in the nation to go undefeated with a record of 11-0, but controversy ensued when the USILA named Johns Hopkins, Navy and Virginia as the national champions, while Cornell was voted fifth in the country. The next season, after losing in the season opener to Virginia, 10-9, Cornell rattled off 13-straight victories. In the semi-finals, Cornell edged Army, 17-16, with Cornell grabbing a 7-4 lead after one period. Army, led by Tom Cafaro who had seven goals and three assists in the game, battled back and by the third period it became a question of who would get the last goal. The lead changed hands twice and the score was tied four times in the final period, before Bob Shaw scored at 12:33 giving Cornell the victory. Frank Davis' four goals against Army in the semi-finals ensured Cornell's place in the national championship.

This was Cornell's first lacrosse title since winning the USILA championship in 1907. Cornell was 1–4–1 against Maryland up to this point, in a series that began with Cornell's 2–1 win in 1921. The teams played a 2–2 tie in 1922, and Maryland won by 11–1 in 1929, 14–2 in 1951, 17–10 in 1963 and 13–6 in 1965. Coach Richie Moran was voted the Division I Coach of the Year, while John Burnap won the Schmeisser Award as the nation’s outstanding defenseman and Bob Rule won the Ens. C.M. Kelly, Jr. Award as the nation’s top goaltender, despite the fact that a season-ending knee injury kept Rule from playing in the NCAA tournament.

In the finals, Al Rimmer fired in six of Cornell's 12 goals, with Cornell never trailing in the game. Rimmer scored first at 59 seconds and though Maryland was able to tie the score at 2-2, the Terps posed no real threat after the first period. The goal that put Cornell ahead for good was produced by their third midfield. With 7:47 to go in the first period, Bob Wagner, a senior from Newton, Pa., scored off an assist by Craig Bollinger, a junior from Rochester, N.Y.  Rimmer then took command and racked up three straight goals. Frank Davis, a junior from Sanborn, N.Y. and Bucky Gunts, a junior from Baltimore, Md. finished up Cornell's string of six straight goals.

Tournament bracket

Tournament boxscores

Tournament Final

Tournament Semi-Finals

Tournament Quarterfinals

Tournament outstanding player

Tom Cafaro, Army18 points, Tournament Leading Scorer

 The NCAA did not designate a Most Outstanding Player until the 1977 national tournament.The Tournament outstanding player listed here is the tournament leading scorer.

See also
Richard M. Moran
Wingate Memorial Trophy

References

External links
 Cornell Reports Vol. 05, No. 07 (June 1971) writeup on title game
 SAE Cornell, Laxmen Win NCAA Crown From Cornell Reports, June 1971
 Photos from 1971 Championship game
 Cornell Nips Army 17-16 The Evening News - Jun 1, 1971 - Semifinal game
 Cornell 1971 in season Video Highlights
 50 Years Ago, Cornell Men's Lacrosse Changed The Game

NCAA Division I Men's Lacrosse Championship
NCAA Division I Men's Lacrosse Championship
NCAA Division I Men's Lacrosse Championship
NCAA Division I Men's Lacrosse Championship
NCAA Division I Men's Lacrosse Championship
NCAA Division I Men's Lacrosse Championship
Lacrosse in New York (state)